Stuart Goldman is an American journalist, author and screenwriter. A former critic for the Los Angeles Times and the Los Angeles Daily News, he later penned a column for the Los Angeles Reader.

Career

Goldman's early career initially found him writing for left-wing papers and magazines. He was one of the original staffers for the L.A. Weekly. However, Goldman ultimately emerged as a conservative journalist whose pieces frequently appeared in National Review and other right-wing journals. Over the years, his pieces have appeared in numerous publications, including Los Angeles Magazine, Rolling Stone, Penthouse, Esquire, Vanity Fair, and California Lawyer. In addition, his syndicated column appeared in newspapers throughout the U.S. and Europe.

For over three years Goldman contributed a weekly column to WorldNetDaily. According to editor Joseph Farah, Goldman's column generated more reader response than any other columnist on the conservative website.

In 1989, Goldman embarked upon a three-year undercover investigation of the tabloid industry, both print and television. Using the pseudonym Wil Runyon (one of the many identities he has employed over the years), he spent three years as a "mole," with the goal of exposing them as a "criminal organization." He enlisted the help of former FBI agent Ted Gunderson and threat-assessor Gavin de Becker in writing his story. When he completed his investigation, Goldman wrote an article for Spy. After a heated bidding war, Goldman sold the rights to his story to Phoenix Pictures, who attached Oliver Stone to direct the feature film.

Musical career

Goldman was raised in a family of classical musicians. Goldman's father is composer/conductor/arranger, Maurice Goldman, primarily recognized for his contribution to the world of Yiddish music. Goldman's mother, Ethel Goldman, was, at 18, the youngest flutist to play in the Cleveland Philharmonic Orchestra.

As a youth, Goldman studied piano, cello and trumpet. While in college, Goldman became enamored with the pedal steel guitar. Over the next 10 years, Goldman played and recorded with numerous artists, including Hoyt Axton, Steve Goodman, Doc Watson, Tanya Tucker, Phil Everly, Clarence Gatemouth Brown, Jo-El Sonnier, Garth Hudson, Leon Russell, and guitarist Albert Lee.

Goldman toured the U.S. and Europe with former Kingston Trio member John Stewart, and Cajun fiddler player, Doug Kershaw. Prior to quitting the music scene, Goldman played several concerts as a member of the Texas Jewboys, backup band for country-singer-cum-detective-writer, Kinky Friedman.

Current work

Goldman's current work combines journalism with his rekindled interest in Judaism—in particular the world of Jewish Music.

The project was born after Goldman discovered that the entire musical collection of his father had disappeared after it was loaned to an alleged “charitable” organization. In the course of trying to locate his father's music, Goldman discovered that the collections of a number of other well-known Jewish musical composers were also missing. Eight years later, what Goldman had thought would be a magazine article had become a book.

Goldman has released a book composed of 40 years of his writing, both fiction and non-fiction.  The book's title is "Adventures In Manic Depression".

Works

Non fiction

Confessions Of A Poison Pen Artist, 1986
With Malice For All, 1986
The Art Of Verbal Self-Defense, 1987
Letters To A Letter Junkie, 1988
Secrets Of The Supersnoopers, 1995
Snitch: Confessions Of A Tabloid Spy, 1998
"Adventures In Manic Depression: Tales In Fine Madness", 2013

Fiction
Adventures In Manic Depression: Tales In Fine Madness,2013

Children's Books

Hags: A Tale Of Teenage Witchcraft, 1995
" Night Of The Crones", 2012

Short story collections

Excitable Boy, 2002

Screenplays

The Bouncer, 1992
The Great Pretender, 1990
Spy Vs. Spies, 1994

Cartoons

The Adventures Of Phobia Man, 1980–1992
The Great Vomit Bus, 1985

Ghostwriter

The Franklin Conspiracy, 1990

Editor

Murder Book: Investigation Of The Murder Of Anthony Brancato and Anthony Trombino: Los Angeles Police Department., DR 880-680, November 29, 1951
Runnin' With The Big Dogs', by Jane Getz, 2014

References

External links
IMDb bioIMDb"True Confessions: An Interview With Myself", Stuart Goldman Stories''

American essayists
American investigative journalists
American male journalists
American literary critics
American male screenwriters
Jewish American musicians
Jewish American writers
Writers from Shaker Heights, Ohio
Undercover journalists
Living people
American male essayists
Journalists from Ohio
Screenwriters from Ohio
Year of birth missing (living people)
21st-century American Jews